A myoneme (or spasmoneme) is a contractile structure found in some eukaryotic single-celled organisms, particularly Vorticella. It consists of a series of protein filaments that shorten rapidly upon exposure to calcium. Although the shortening can be up to 100 lengths per second, faster than any muscle, the relaxation time is several seconds (compared to approximately one tenth of a second for muscle). The myonemes of Acantharea also display slow contraction and undulation movements.

References 

Cell biology